Night Lamp is a science fiction adventure novel by Jack Vance. It follows an orphan named Jaro Fath on his quest to learn where he came from.

Plot summary
When the Faths, a childless academic couple, save young Jaro from a near-fatal beating, they discover he suffers from not just physical wounds, but also the crippling memory of his mother's death, which must be erased.  Adopted by them, he grows up an outsider in a world of constant striving for social status, his only goal to become a spaceman and discover the truth of his missing memories.  His journey takes him to Fader, a planet closed to the rest of the galaxy, whose inhabitants long ago engineered slave races to support their aristocratic lifestyle.  Though Fader's Golden Age has long passed, and they now live in fear of many of their creations, they still maintain a fierce pride.  Together with his father, Jaro must find a way to bring justice for his mother.

References

External links

1996 American novels
Novels by Jack Vance
1996 science fiction novels
American science fiction novels
Novels about orphans
Tor Books books